HNLMS Bonaire was a fourth-class screw steamship of the Royal Netherlands Navy, now under restoration as a museum ship.

Bonaire was built for the Royal Netherlands Navy as a steam frigate with barquentine rig and a retractable screw, and was launched at Rotterdam on 12 May 1877.

From 1924 she served at Delfzijl as living quarters for the Dutch Nautical College, and was renamed Abel Tasman.

After Abel Tasman lay abandoned for many years, a restoration programme began in 2005 at Den Helder to secure the future of the ship as a floating museum.

See also 
 
 
 
 List of museum ships

References

External links 
Stichting BONAIRE – the charity that undertakes the restoration of Zr.Ms. BONAIRE
Photo-collection on Zr.Ms. BONAIRE
Photos of "Bonaire"

Museum ships in the Netherlands
19th-century naval ships of the Netherlands
1877 ships
Ships built in Rotterdam